Alexander Stepanovich Yakovlev (23 November 1886 – 4 November 1953) was a Russian/Soviet writer.

Biography
Yakovlev was born into the family of a house painter in the town of Volsk. He fought in World War 1. His works concentrate on the lives of working-class people. Yakovlev is credited with being one of the first writers to depict the Russian Revolution of 1917 on a broad canvas in his novel October (1918). He was the author of many novels, including Fires in the Field (1934–35) and Steps (1940), and a number of stories and essays. He also chronicled the rescue attempts made on the expeditions of Nobile and Roald Amundsen, in which he took part. He died in Moscow in 1953.

English translations
The Peasant, from The Salt Pit and Other Stories, Raduga, Moscow, 1988.

References

1886 births
1953 deaths
People from Volsk
People from Volsky Uyezd
Russian male novelists
Russian male short story writers
Soviet short story writers
Soviet novelists
20th-century Russian short story writers
Russian military personnel of World War I
20th-century novelists
20th-century Russian male writers